Innsbrook may refer to:

 Innsbrook, Missouri, a village in Warren County, Missouri, United States
 Innsbrook, Virginia, a census-designated place in Henrico County, Virginia, United States

See also
 Innisbrook Resort and Golf Club, a hotel and country club resort in the southeastern United States
 Innisbrook, Florida, an unincorporated community in Pinellas County, Florida, United States
 Innsbruck, the capital of Tyrol and fifth-largest city in Austria
 "Innsbruck, ich muss dich lassen", a German Renaissance song